The Youngs River is a tributary of the Columbia River, approximately  long, in northwest Oregon in the United States.

It rises in a remote section of the mountains of central Clatsop County, north of Saddle Mountain State Natural Area. It flows generally northwest, passing over Youngs River Falls. The falls were encountered in 1806 by a hunting party of the Lewis and Clark Expedition from nearby Fort Clatsop and documented in William Clark's journals. It broadens in a large estuary and enters the south end of Youngs Bay on the Columbia at Astoria.

Named tributaries of Youngs River from source to mouth are Fall Creek and South Fork Youngs River, then Fox, Osgood, Rock, Bayney, Wawa, and Moosmoos creeks followed by the Klaskanine River. Below that come Cooperage, Battle Creek, Tucker, Casey, Binder, and Cook sloughs followed by the Wallooskee River. Further downstream are Crosel, Brown, and Craig creeks followed by Knowland Slough and the Lewis and Clark River.

See also
Skipanon River
List of rivers of Oregon
List of tributaries of the Columbia River

References

External links

Lewis and Clark Expedition
Rivers of Oregon
Rivers of Clatsop County, Oregon
Tributaries of the Columbia River